The Swedish Commission on Security and Integrity Protection is a Swedish administrative authority sorting under the Ministry of Justice responsible for supervising law enforcement agencies' use of secret surveillance techniques, assumed identities and other associated activities. The commission also supervise the processing of personal data by the Swedish Police Authority. It is also obliged to check whether someone has been the subject of secret surveillance or subject to the processing of personal data, at the request of an individual, and if it was done within bounds of applicable legislation.

See also
 Swedish Economic Crime Authority
 Swedish Police Authority
 Swedish Security Service

References

External links
 

Government agencies of Sweden
Information privacy
Privacy